Jan Volk is a former basketball executive who served as the General Manager of the Boston Celtics from 1984 to 1997.

Volk joined the Celtics in 1971 after graduating from Columbia Law School. His early work with the team included ticket sales director, manager of equipment purchases, traveling secretary, business manager, and general counsel. In 1976 he was promoted to vice president. After assistant general manager Jeff Cohen left in 1981 to become GM of the Kansas City Kings, Volk was chosen to succeed him while remaining the team's chief legal counsel. When Red Auerbach announced that he would retire as Celtics general manager following the 1984 NBA Draft, he designated Volk as his preference as his successor. On July 11, 1984 Volk was officially named General Manager of the Boston Celtics.

Volk's first move as Celtics General Manager came on October 16, 1984 when he traded Gerald Henderson to the Seattle SuperSonics for a 1st round pick in the 1986 NBA Draft. In his first season as GM, the Celtics had a 63–19 record and returned to the NBA Finals, losing to the Los Angeles Lakers in six games.

For the 1985–86 season, Volk drafted Sam Vincent and traded for Bill Walton and Jerry Sichting. In his second season as GM, the Celtics won the NBA Championship, defeating the Houston Rockets 4–2.

Using the draft pick he obtained as compensation for Gerald Henderson, Volk selected Len Bias with the second overall pick in the 1986 NBA Draft. On June 20, 1986, three days after the draft, Bias died of a cardiac arrhythmia related to usage of cocaine. Despite the death of their top draft pick, the Celtics finished the 1986–87 season with a 59–23 and appeared in their fourth consecutive NBA Finals, losing to the Lakers 4–2.

The Celtics made the playoffs during each of Volk's next six seasons as GM, but did not return to the NBA Finals. After a 32–50 1993–94 season, many of Volk's responsibilities, including the drafting and signing of players, were reassigned to Director of Basketball Operations M. L. Carr. He resigned from the team on May 6, 1997, which allowed incoming team president and head coach Rick Pitino to hire his own General Manager.

References

Year of birth missing (living people)
Living people
Boston Celtics executives
Colby College alumni
Columbia Law School alumni
National Basketball Association general managers